Tom Spillane (born 1962) was a Gaelic footballer who played for Templenoe and the Kerry county team in the 1980s.

Career
Maura Spillane gave birth to Tom in Templenoe, near Kenmare, County Kerry in 1962. He was — along with his brothers Pat and Mick — a key member of the successful Kerry Gaelic football teams of the 1980s.

He won an All-Ireland Minor Football Championship medal in 1980 before first breaking into the county panel in 1981. He played with Kerry for the next eleven seasons, winning four All-Ireland Senior Football Championship medals, five Munster Senior Football Championship medals, one Kerry Senior Football Championship and three All Stars.

Himself and Ger Lynch — assigned to mark Tommy Conroy and Barney Rock during the 1984 All-Ireland Senior Football Championship Final — began their efforts during the national anthem, which they sang with aplomb. Spillane, quoted in the book Princes of Pigskin, said of this tactic later: "There was no belting but the plot was to sing the National Anthem as loud as we could into their ears to put the fear of God into them. Neither of us were great singers but they must have thought we were wired to the moon".

Together with his brothers Mick and Pat, the Spillanes hold a record 19 All-Ireland medals between them. However, he won a mere four All-Ireland medals besides Mick's seven and Pat's eight.

Tom Spillane works as an auctioneer and runs his business from Killarney. He specialises in dealing with property in the Killarney and Kenmare areas.

Spillane's brother Pat took over their mother's bar, renaming it Pat Spillane's Bar, and ran it before leasing it. Tom Spillane bought the pub from Pat Spillane in the late 2010s, with the intention of running it alongside his sons Killian and Adrian (also Kerry footballers).

References

1962 births
Living people
All Stars Awards winners (football)
Gaelic football backs
Irish auctioneers
Kerry inter-county Gaelic footballers
Tom
Templenoe Gaelic footballers
Winners of four All-Ireland medals (Gaelic football)